The Shipping Control Authority for the Japanese Merchant Marine (SCAJAP) was an organization established by Allied forces in the occupation of Japan after the end of World War II.

Purpose
 control over all ships greater than 100 gross tons operated by the Japanese.
 to provide the Japanese with a repatriation fleet, consisting of the temporary loan of American ships operated by trained Japanese crews.
 to provide the Japanese a means of repatriating war personnel.

Organization
SCAJAP was subject to the Commander, Naval Forces, Far East (COMNAVFE). The SCAJAP fleet was designated Task Group 96-3 in the organization of Naval Forces Japan.

Fleet and operations

At the end of the war Japan was acutely short of large passenger ships. Only two had survived hostilities: NKK Line's Hikawa Maru and OSK Line's Takasago Maru. Both had served as hospital ships and SCAJAP requisitioned them as transport ships.

On 7 December 1945 a conference was held at Tokyo as a result of which it was recommended that 100 Liberty ships, 100 LSTs and seven hospital ships be made available to SCAJAP for repatriation. The ships were to be converted in Japan to carry repatriates and were crewed by the Japanese.

Of the shipping requested, 106 Liberties and 100 LST's were received, but only 85 of the LST's were retained for repatriation, the other 15 LST's being used to support the economy of Korea. On arrival in Japan, under direction of SCAJAP, these ships were modified to carry passengers, provided with trained Japanese crews, and put in service at a rate of 25 a week. Six of the Liberties were converted into hospital ships of about 1,200 beds each. Since total available passenger capacity of these SCAJAP vessels was approximately 400,000 by the end of March 1946, all United States Seventh Fleet shipping was released from repatriation. Over 50 percent of the total Japanese repatriation fleet, with a capacity of 100,000 spaces supplemented US shipping.

Temporary service of an active US ship
An example of the use of a commissioned US ship, such as  being temporarily assigned to SCAJAP, can be found here.

See also
List of major U.S. Commands of World War II

Notes

Sources
DEMOBILIZATION AND DISARMAMENT OF THE JAPANESE ARMED FORCES 
Report on Mass Repatriation in the Western Pacific April 1947
History of United States Naval Operations: Korea

Shipping Control
Maritime transport authorities